Akihiro Sato (佐藤 晃大, born 22 October 1986) is a Japanese football player for Tokushima Vortis.

Career statistics

Club
Updated to end of 2018 season.

References

External links
Profile at Tokushima Vortis

1986 births
Living people
Tokai University alumni
People from Zama, Kanagawa
Association football people from Kanagawa Prefecture
Japanese footballers
J1 League players
J2 League players
Tokushima Vortis players
Gamba Osaka players
Association football forwards